Janusz Marja Stefan Rogala Kaluski (1924–2010) was a sapper in the Polish Army who took part in the D-Day landings of World War II and who later  won the Cross of Valour. In later life, Kaluski devoted himself to the philately of Poland, eventually becoming a Fellow of the Royal Philatelic Society London and donating his stamp collection of fifty years to the British Library Philatelic Collections in 2003.

Early life
Jan Kaluski was born in Poland in 1924 and began collecting stamps in 1933, continuing until the outbreak of World War II in 1939.

World War II
Kaluski joined the Polish Army in the West in 1941, after arriving in Scotland via Persia, Palestine, Egypt and South Africa. He took part in the D-Day landings as a sapper and carried out mine-clearing work in the Netherlands. He was awarded the Cross of Valour. After the war he settled in the United Kingdom where he lived for the rest of his life.

Later life
Kaluski restarted his stamp collection in the early 1950s and spent the following fifty years expanding it.

He was reported as saying that he wished to donate his collection to the British people as a way of thanking them for welcoming him to Britain.

The Kaluski Collection
The Kaluski Collection was donated to the British Library Philatelic Collections in 2003 and includes in 46 volumes postage stamps and postal history material of Poland from 1835 to 2002.

See also
Polonus Philatelic Society
Postage stamps and postal history of Poland

References

Further reading
Bojanowicz, M A, The Kingdom of Poland. Poland No. 1 and associated postal history. London: Royal Philatelic Society, 1979.

External links
Image of Janusz Kaluski presenting his collection to David Beech in 2003.
 Society for Polish Philately in Great Britain

Kaluski, Janusz
Kaluski, Janusz
Kaluski, Janusz
Kaluski, Janusz
Kaluski, Janusz
Kaluski, Janusz
Philately of Poland
Fellows of the Royal Philatelic Society London
Recipients of the Cross of Valour (Poland)